Neco Jeborie Brett (born 22 March 1992) is a Jamaican footballer who plays as a forward for USL Championship club Birmingham Legion.

Club career
Brett began his career in Jamaica with Harbour View and Portmore United before moving to the United States to play college soccer at Robert Morris University.

Portland Timbers
On 14 January 2016, Brett was selected in the second round (40th overall) of the 2016 MLS SuperDraft by Portland Timbers. He made his MLS debut as a late sub in a 4–2 win against Vancouver Whitecaps FC on 22 May 2016.

Pittsburgh Riverhounds
In 2018, Brett signed with the Pittsburgh Riverhounds. On 26 October 2019, he tied a Riverhounds record with four goals in a 7–0 win over Birmingham Legion FC in the Eastern Conference quarterfinals of the USL Championship playoffs.

Birmingham Legion
On 17 December 2019, Brett joined Birmingham Legion FC. Brett made his debut for Birmingham on 15 July 2020 during a 3-0 victory over Memphis 901 FC. Brett would go on to score his first and second goals for Birmingham on 5 August 2020 during a 4-1 victory over Charlotte Independence. Brett would finish the 2020 season as Birmingham's leading scorer with 9 goals. On 28 September 2021, Brett was named USL Championship Player of the Week for Week 23 of the 2021 season for his hat trick against Atlanta United 2. Brett earned the Legion FC golden boot award for a second consecutive season with 18 goals in 2021.

New Mexico United
Brett signed a contract for the 2022 season with USL Championship side New Mexico United on 31 December 2021. 
 Brett scored in his debut on 13 March 2022 during a 2-0 victory over Las Vegas Lights FC. On 11 April 2022, Brett was awarded the USL Championship Goal of the Month award for his chipped finish in a 2-1 victory over El Paso Locomotive FC on 20 March 2022.

Return to Birmingham Legion
On 20 January 2023, Nett re-joined his previous club Birmingham Legion.

International career
In 2011, Brett played for the Jamaica u20 national team in Mexico. He was called up to represent the Jamaica national team in May 2022. He made his debut in a 6–0 friendly defeat to Catalonia on 25 May.

Career Statistics

Honors

References

External links

 
 

1992 births
Living people
Sportspeople from Kingston, Jamaica
Jamaican footballers
Jamaica international footballers
Jamaica under-20 international footballers
Jamaica youth international footballers
Robert Morris Colonials men's soccer players
Reading United A.C. players
Portland Timbers players
Portland Timbers 2 players
Pittsburgh Riverhounds SC players
Birmingham Legion FC players
New Mexico United players
Association football forwards
Portland Timbers draft picks
Major League Soccer players
USL Championship players
Expatriate soccer players in the United States